Justice Schroeder may refer to:

Alfred G. Schroeder (1916–1998), associate justice of the Kansas Supreme Court
Gerald F. Schroeder (born 1939), associate justice and chief justice of the Idaho Supreme Court

See also
Judge Schroeder (disambiguation)
Wilfrid Schroder (1946–2013), associate justice of the Kentucky Supreme Court